The Nelons are an American southern gospel group based in Atlanta, Georgia. Group members are Kelly Nelon Clark, her husband Jason Clark, and Kelly's daughters Amber Nelon Kistler and Autumn Nelon Clark.  The Nelons were inducted into the Gospel Music Association (GMA) Hall of Fame in 2016.

Group history 

The Nelons was started by founding member Rex Nelon as The Rex Nelon Singers in 1977. The group was a spin-off of the family group the Lefevres. They became known as the Rex Nelon Singers in 1976 because the Lefevre family members had left the group. The group's first number-one song was "Come Morning" on the Singing News Chart, and was awarded the Southern Gospel Song of the Decade for the 1980s.  Another widely recognizable song by the group is "We Shall Wear a Robe and Crown."

Over time the group included Karen Peck, Janet Paschal, Jerry Thompson, Charlotte Ritchie, Kelly Nelon Clark, Todd Nelon, Jeff Stice, Martin Gureasko, Rodney Swain, Stan Whitmire, Ray Fisher, Vernon Lee.

The Nelons have been nominated for many awards in the southern gospel music industry including Grammys, Dove Awards, Singing News Awards, Absolutely Gospel Awards, Diamond Awards, and Christian Voice Awards.

In 2014, the Nelons were a trio made up Kelly Nelon Clark, Jason Clark, and Amber Nelon Thompson. In 2014, Amber was chosen as Female Vocalist of the Year at the Absolutely Gospel Music Awards. Currently, The Nelons are made up of Kelly Nelon Clark, Jason Clark, Amber Nelon Kistler, and Autumn Nelon Clark.

Personnel 
 Rex Nelon – bass (1977–1999)
 Kelly Nelon Clark – alto (1977–1991; 1993–present)
 Rodney Swain – lead (1977–1984)
 Janet Paschal – soprano (1977–1981)
 Jerry Thompson – tenor/lead (1977–1992, 1993–1998)
 Karen Peck – soprano (1981–1990)
 Martin Gureasko – pianist (1990-1992)
 Stan Whitmire - pianist (1986, 1993-1996)
 Charlotte Ritchie – soprano (1991–1993, 1994–1996)
 Kelly Benton – soprano (1993)
 Amy Roth – soprano (1996–1999)
 Melody Williams – soprano (1999–2001)
 Katy Peach (then Katy VanHorn) – soprano (2001–2002)
 Amber Nelon Kistler – soprano (2002–present)
 Paul White – lead (1992–1993)
 Tammy Britton – alto (1991–1993)
 David Hill – lead (1998–1999)
 Paul Lancaster – tenor (1999–2001)
 Jason Clark – lead (1997–present)
 Todd Nelon – baritone (1981-1994)
 Dan Clark – bass (1999–2002)
 Kevin Davis - piano (2000-2012)
 Autumn Nelon Clark - soprano (2014–present)
 Ray Fisher - piano (1980 - 1986)

Discography 

Albums:
as Rex Nelon Singers
 1977: The Sun's Coming Up
 1978: Live
 1978: I've Never Been This Homesick Before
 1979: Feelings
 1980: Expressions of Love
 1981: Sing The Gospel
 1981: One More Song
 1981: One Step Closer
 1982: Feeling At Home
 1983: We Shall Behold The King
 1984: Precious Old Story of Love
 1984: I've Got My Foot On The Rock

As The Nelons

 1985: In One Accord
 1986: Journeys
 1987: Thanks
 1988: Get Ready
 1989: Let The Redeemed Say So
 1990: The Best of Times
 1991: One Less Stone
 1991: A New Generation
 1992: Right On Time
 1993: Kelly Nelon Thompson & The Nelons
 1994: A Promised Reunion 
 1994: He's My Comfort
 1994: Triumphant
 1995: Hallelujah Live
 1996: We're Glad You're Here
 1997: We've Got To Praise Him
 1997: Thanks Live
 1997: All Rise Live
 1998: Peace Within The Walls
 1999: A Journey
 2000: Following After
 2001: Season of Song 1 Nelon Classics
 2002: United for Christ
 2003: Season of Song 2
 2004: The Light of Home
 2008: You Are God
 2010: Beside Still Waters
 2011: Come On Home
 2012: Evening in December
 2014: Hymns: The A Capella Sessions
 2016 Stronger Together EP
2016 Family Harmony
 2018 A Winter Carol
 2022 Scars In Heaven

Compilations
 1984: Best & Whole Lot More
 1997: Timeless Collection
 1998: The Collection
 1998: Out Front – Best of Rex Nelon

Kelly Nelon solo
 1983: Her Father's Child
 1985: Praise Him Now
 1988: Called By Love
 1990: KNT
 1992: Steadfast Heart

Accolades 
1999: Rex Nelon - Southern Gospel Museum and Hall of Fame Inductee
2013: People Choice Silver Telly Award – "Excuse Me Are You Jesus" 
2016: Gospel Music Hall of Fame Inductee

References

External links

Family musical groups
Musical groups from Georgia (U.S. state)
Southern gospel performers